Ģirts Ankipāns (born November 29, 1975) is a retired Latvian ice hockey player and coach.  Currently he serves as the head coach of Dinamo Riga in KHL.

Career

Playing career
He started his professional ice hockey career in Latvia, where he played for various local teams. During the 1996-97 season, he became the best goal-scorer of the Latvian Hockey League. Next 7 seasons Ankipāns spent playing in German hockey leagues. Before the 2003-04 season, he returned to Latvia and joined HK Riga 2000.
He played five seasons with Dinamo Riga in KHL before retiring as player.

International career
He has played for the Latvia men's national ice hockey team in 2003, 2005 and 2009 World Championships as well as in 2006 Winter Olympics.

Coaching career
After ending his career as player Ankipāns joined Dinamo coaching staff as assistant coach. On September 28, 2017, he became the interim head coach of the team, replacing Sandis Ozoliņš. On March 29, 2018 Ankipāns was signed as the head coach.

Career statistics

Regular season and playoffs

LAT totals do not include numbers from the 2005–06 season, and 2006–07 playoffs.

International

References

External links
 
 Ģirts Ankipāns at Dinamo Riga
 
 
 

1975 births
Living people
Dinamo Riga players
EHC Neuwied players
EV Füssen players
EV Landshut players
HC Dinamo Minsk players
HK Liepājas Metalurgs players
HK Riga 2000 players
Ice hockey players at the 2006 Winter Olympics
Ice hockey players at the 2010 Winter Olympics
Latvian ice hockey coaches
Latvian ice hockey centres
Latvian expatriate ice hockey people
Latvian expatriate sportspeople in Norway
Lillehammer IK players
Olympic ice hockey players of Latvia
Ice hockey people from Riga
Latvian expatriate sportspeople in Germany
Latvian expatriate sportspeople in Belarus
Expatriate ice hockey players in Norway
Expatriate ice hockey players in Belarus
Expatriate ice hockey players in Germany